Whitby is a suburb of Perth, Western Australia, located near the South Western Highway in the Shire of Serpentine-Jarrahdale.

It is named after the nearby Whitby Falls, with the name approved for the locality in November 1988.

References

Suburbs of Perth, Western Australia
Shire of Serpentine-Jarrahdale